Manuel Elipidio Fortuna (born March 23, 1985) is a professional basketball player for the Dominican Republic. He competed in the 2012 Summer Olympics.

2012 Summer Olympics exhibition
In an exhibition game against the 2012 United States men's Olympic basketball team, as a warmup for Team USA prior to playing in the Olympics, Fortuna led the Dominican Republic with 10 points; however, the team would lose to Team USA, 113-59. The Dominican Republic squad did not qualify for the 2012 Olympics, however.

References

1985 births
Living people
Dominican Republic men's basketball players
Point guards
Shooting guards